Goldsborough is a small hamlet in the civil parish of Lythe, North Yorkshire, England within the North York Moors National Park. It is situated a few miles west of Whitby.

It was the site of a Roman signal station.

References

Villages in North Yorkshire
Roman sites in North Yorkshire
Populated coastal places in North Yorkshire
Borough of Scarborough